Mubarak Muyika (born May 31, 1994, Western Province, Kenya), is a Kenyan American  business executive, computer programmer and  internet entrepreneur based in Silicon Valley. Orphaned at the age of 10, at age 16 Muyika founded Hype Century, a web hosting company which he sold two years later for six figures. He is the founder and CEO of Zagace, a company which runs an app store for businesses to access software for accounting, human resource management, marketing, among other uses.

Forbes listed him as one of Forbes Africas 30 under 30 both in 2015 and 2017, and he was youngest in Business Insider's list of top young entrepreneurs around the world.

Early life and education 

Mubarak Muyika was born  in Western Province, Kenya. His father was the district commissioner of Siaya, a senior civil servant, who died when Mubarak was 2, and mother a high school teacher who died when he was 11. Muyika was raised by his mother's sister and her husband in the suburbs of Nairobi.

While a student at Friends School Kamusinga, Muyika won two awards in Kenya's national science fair, the annual Kenya Students Congress on Science and Technology:

In the fair's 48th edition in 2010, he won for a technical whitepaper titled 'Kahunic infra-photo surveyor', which was presented as a computer talk, and was ranked first in that category. Muyika's whitepaper was based on Java, MySQL and C++ dependencies, infra-red and laser rays, and customized ray emitters to identify objects concealed behind concrete and wood, among other uses, by use of reflection and refraction.

In the fair's 49th edition the following year, Muyika won for a database he developed to manage the flow of petrol and movement of oil tankers. The project's original name in the fair was 'Techno Fibre System', but it was also referred to as 'Enhanced petrol tracker'. It was presented as a computer exhibit in the ICT category, and although Muyika was recognized as the best student in the category, the project was ranked third nationally in the category.

He graduated from Friend's School Kamusinga in 2011.

Career 

His adoptive parents operated a small book publishing and distribution company, Acrodile Publishers. Using online resources and technical experience gained in earlier years, Muyika built a better Website for the company.

In 2011, Muyika founded Hype Century Technologies & Investments Limited, a company focused on website creation and webhosting. The following year, for his work in HypeCentury, he received the Anzisha Prize for young entrepreneurs, from the African Leadership Academy.

Muyika sold HypeCentury to Wemps Telecoms in a six figure deal in May 2013. By the time of the sale Hypecentury had 14 employees and was handling over 700 companies with 1400 domains. HypeCentury has since rebranded and is a fully owned subsidiary of Wemps Telecoms.

Later in 2013, Muyika founded Zagace in Nairobi with proceeds from the sale of HypeCentury, with additional funding from investors. Zagace has since raised a number of angel investments from various investors.

In June 2015, Zagace's parent company was restructured as a Delaware-based parent corporation of the same name, with the company now based in San Jose, California.

See also
List of African millionaires
List of Internet entrepreneurs

References

External links 
 Zagace Official Site

1994 births
Living people
Kenyan businesspeople
Kenyan company founders
African computer businesspeople
Kenyan expatriates in the United States
Alumni of Friends School Kamusinga
Technology company founders
Internet company founders
Chief executives in the technology industry
American software engineers
American technology chief executives
People from Nairobi
Kenyan chief executives
21st-century American businesspeople
American chairpersons of corporations
American Internet company founders
Businesspeople from the San Francisco Bay Area
American corporate directors